Johan Joussep Sotil Eche (born August 29, 1982) is a Peruvian footballer. He can play on either wing on the pitch.

Johan is the son of former FC Barcelona player Hugo Sotil. Johan took his name from his godfather, former FC Barcelona player Johan Cruijff.

Club career
He was attached to Belgian Jupiler League side VC Westerlo, with whom he signed a contract on June 14, 2008.

External links
 
 
 

1982 births
Living people
Footballers from Lima
Peruvian footballers
Peruvian expatriate footballers
Peru international footballers
Association football wingers
Peruvian Primera División players
Club Universitario de Deportes footballers
Alianza Atlético footballers
Coronel Bolognesi footballers
Unión Huaral footballers
Club Alianza Lima footballers
José Gálvez FBC footballers
K.V.C. Westerlo players
Sport Huancayo footballers
Club Deportivo Universidad César Vallejo footballers
Universidad Técnica de Cajamarca footballers
León de Huánuco footballers
Comerciantes Unidos footballers
Sport Loreto players
Santos de Nasca players
Peruvian expatriate sportspeople in Belgium
Expatriate footballers in Belgium